

Incumbents
Caudillo: Francisco Franco

Events
November 9 – Joaquín Rodrigo's Concierto de Aranjuez premieres in Barcelona, Spain.

Births
Robert Saladrigas, Spanish writer, journalist and literary critic (d. 2018)
February 25 – Jesús López Cobos, Spanish-born conductor (d. 2018)
April 20 – Pilar Miró, Spanish screenwriter and film director (d. 1997)

Deaths
February 8 - Antonio Escobar Huertas (born 1879)
 26 September — Walter Benjamin, German-Spanish philosopher and critic (born 1892)
October 15 - Lluís Companys, execution by firing squad (born 1882)
November 3 - Manuel Azaña (born 1880)

See also
List of Spanish films of the 1940s

External links

 
1940s in Spain
Years of the 20th century in Spain